Thomas William Frederick Headon (born 17 August 2000) is a British-born Australian singer-songwriter based in London. He rose to prominence with his debut singles "Grace" and "Clean Me Up" which were released in 2019. As of March 2022, the songs have garnered 7 million and 13 million streams on Spotify respectively.

Early life 
Headon was born in London, England. His family moved to Melbourne, Australia when he was five years old. He started learning music and writing songs at the age of fourteen. Headon grew up in Australia, and moved back to London in 2019 to pursue a musical career. Prior to becoming a professional musician, Headon posted covers of songs on his YouTube channel.

Musical career 
He started releasing music in 2019, with his debut single "Grace", and this was followed by other songs including "Clean Me Up", "Loving You" and "Car Window".

In 2020 he embarked on his first international tour, including dates in the UK. He also teamed up with Alfie Templeman and Chloe Moriondo on the single "Dizzy".

He released his debut EP, The Greatest Hits, in March 2020 and his third EP, Victoria, was released in March 2022, trailed by the singles "Nobody Has to Know", "Strawberry Kisses" and "How Do I Know?". He was named by the Official Charts Company as an artist to watch for 2022 and MTV highlighted him as one of their "Push" artists tipped for success. Thomas supported indie band Only the Poets on their 2022 summer tour of Europe. He is also due to support Sigrid on her European tour.

Musical style 
Headon's sound mixes a variety of different genres including indie pop, lo-fi, and alternative. Headon himself remains uncommitted as to which genre he focuses on the most.

He cites artists such as Harry Styles, The 1975, and Coldplay as inspirations for his music.

Discography

Extended plays

Singles

As lead artist

As featured artist

References

External links
Official Website

Australian musicians
2000 births
Living people